Cenellipsis is a genus of radiolarians in the order Spumellaria. The genus is extant but there are also fossil species.

Cenellipsis Rüst, 1885b, p. 286 is a Nomen Nudum (no description).

References

External links 

 
 

Radiolarian genera
Polycystines